Hoppegarten is a municipality in the district Märkisch-Oderland, in Brandenburg, Germany.

History
The current municipality was created in 2003 when the former municipalities of Hönow and Münchehofe were united with Dahlwitz-Hoppegarten. The old Dahlwitz-Hoppegarten is now a district composed by Birkenstein and Waldesruh.

Geography

Hoppegarten is located close to the eastern suburbs of Berlin (Mahlsdorf, in the borough of Marzahn-Hellersdorf). The other bordering municipalities are Ahrensfelde (BAR), Werneuchen (BAR), Altlandsberg, Neuenhagen and Schöneiche (LOS).

The municipality is composed by three urban districts (Ortsteil): Dahlwitz-Hoppegarten, Hönow (detached from the rest of municipal area by a strip belonging to Berlin) and Münchehofe.

Transport
The town is served by Berlin S-Bahn and it has 2 stations on S5 line (Birkenstein and Hoppegarten). The Berlin U-Bahn line U5 has its end station in Hönow.

Demography

Twin towns
 Iffezheim (Germany)
 Rzepin (Poland)

See also
Hönow
Hoppegarten railway station
Birkenstein railway station
Hönow railway station

References

External links

 Official site of Hoppegarten

Localities in Märkisch-Oderland